Muelleranthus is a genus of flowering plants in the legume family, Fabaceae. It belongs to the subfamily Faboideae.

Species
Muelleranthus comprises the following species:

 Muelleranthus stipularis (J.M.Black) A.T.Lee
 Muelleranthus trifoliolatus (F.Muell.) A.T.Lee

Species names with uncertain taxonomic status
The status of the following species is unresolved:
 Muelleranthus obovatus I.Thomps.
 Muelleranthus parvalatus I.Thomps.

References

Mirbelioids
Fabaceae genera